Euonymus morrisonensis is a species of plant in the family Celastraceae. It is endemic to Taiwan.  It is threatened by habitat loss.

References

Flora of Taiwan
morrisonensis
Vulnerable plants
Taxonomy articles created by Polbot
Taxobox binomials not recognized by IUCN